The 1997 AFL season was the one hundred and first season of the Australian Football League/Victorian Football League. Ninety eight players made their senior debut in the 1997 season, while another 56 players debuted for a new club having previously played in the AFL.

Debuts

References

Australian rules football records and statistics
Australian rules football-related lists
1997 in Australian rules football